KCIC (88.5 FM) is a radio station broadcasting a religious radio format. Licensed to Grand Junction, Colorado, United States, it serves the Grand Junction area.  The station is currently owned by Pear Park Baptist Schools.

History
KCIC signed on March 1, 1979, as the first Christian radio station in Grand Junction. It initially operated from a converted nursery in the back of the Pear Park Baptist Church complex, utilizing an all-volunteer staff and broadcasting religious music, church services and talk and teaching programs; the church built separate facilities in the early 1980s.

References

External links
 

CIC
Radio stations established in 1979